The following is a list of all team-to-team transactions that have occurred in the National Hockey League during the 1981–82 NHL season. It lists what team each player has been traded to, signed by, or claimed by, and for which player(s) or draft pick(s), if applicable.

Trades between teams

June

July

August

September

October

November

December 

  This is a compensation trade.  Savard retired from the NHL on August 12, 1981.  The Jets selected him in the NHL waiver draft on October 5, 1981.  The trade was completed upon Savard's return to the NHL with the Jets.
  Dean Talafous did not report to Quebec and retired from hockey.  Pat Hickey was substituted to complete the trade after an arbitrator's decision on March 8, 1982.

January 

  Trade completed in May, 1982.

February 

  Trade completed on June 9, 1982 at the 1982 NHL Entry Draft.

March 
 Trading Deadline: March 9, 1982

References

Additional sources
 hockeydb.com - search for player and select "show trades"
 

National Hockey League transactions
1981–82 NHL season